The characters of the Inuyasha manga series were created by Rumiko Takahashi. Most of the series takes place in a fictional version of Japan's Warring States period with occasional time-travel/flashback elements to modern Tokyo or the Heisei period. The setting and plot incorporate many elements of traditional Japanese folklore and religion. Its main characters (both protagonists and antagonists) include a Shintō priestess, a Buddhist monk and several types of yōkai, usually rendered as "demon" in English-language translations of the series. The anime adaptation of Inuyasha is followed by a sequel titled Yashahime: Princess Half-Demon where its characters are also listed here.

Inuyasha main characters

Inuyasha

 was born of a dog-demon father and a human mother. He is an arrogant, prideful and stubborn half-demon, but has a soft side to him. He also has an older half brother, Sesshomaru, who is a full-demon with a full-demon mother. He has the appearance of a fifteen-year-old boy. As a half-demon, he had a difficult and lonely childhood, as demons and humans despised him for his mixed bloodline.

Kagome Higurashi

 is a brave and kind girl, the reincarnation of the Sengoku period priestess Kikyo, who believes in never turning her back on someone in trouble. Although physically weak, she is not lacking in courage. She becomes highly skilled in archery as the series progresses, and eventually learns to master her immensely strong spiritual powers. Of all characters in the series, she has the most emotional strength, never allowing anger or jealousy to commit acts of evil. By the start of Yashahime she is spiritually as strong as Kikyo, and possibly stronger given that she developed her own powers of arrow disappearance. Despite her inexperience, Naraku greatly fears Kagome's purifying powers, causing him to target her even more often than Inuyasha.

Miroku

 is an eighteen-year-old lecherous and intelligent Buddhist monk who travels the countryside performing spiritual services, such as exorcisms and demon exterminations, though he has a habit of either ripping off or outright robbing weathy clients. Miroku can attack enemies with his khakkhara and sutra scrolls. Due to the curse's nature to eventually kill him, Miroku sought to find himself a wife to sire children before eventually falling in love with Sango. In the sequel series, after starting a family with Sango after his curse was lifted, Miroku left his family to train himself to fight demons without his Wind Tunnel.

Sango

 is a sixteen-year-old . She hails from a village that practices the act as their profession and is also the original home of the Shikon Jewel; she is described by her father as the most skilled exterminator in the village. While travelling, she wears a traditional woman's kimono, over which she wears long skirt, most likely "mo-bakama", and traditional woman's arm guards and leg guards, and straw sandals. As a demon slayer, Sango dresses in a black skin-tight jumpsuit, and pink armor plates made of demon parts, and a red sash.

Shippo

 is a young orphaned kitsune, who attempts to steal the Shikon Jewel from Inuyasha and Kagome, wanting to become stronger and avenge his father's death. Though his plan fails, Inuyasha and Kagome aid him after hearing his story, and he becomes their companion. Deeply loyal to Kagome, he often calls Inuyasha out on his bad behavior toward her. He is frequently clobbered by Inuyasha for playing tricks on him, and for blurting out uncomfortable or embarrassing facts. Despite this, he views the entire group as his surrogate family.

Kirara

 is Sango's faithful companion who usually appears to be a small kitten-sized feline with two tails, but can become large enough to carry several passengers across the air whenever the need arises. She is a spiritual entity and traveled with Midoriko in the past. In the sequel series, Kirara becomes Hisui's companion while occasionally aiding Setsuna.

Yashahime: Princess Half-Demon main characters

Towa Higurashi

 is fourteen-years-old. She is Sesshōmaru and Rin's eldest daughter and Setsuna's twin sister making her a half-demon. When she was four-years-old, she was transported to the modern era through the power of the Sacred Tree of Ages. She was raised by Sōta Higurashi, her half-uncle-in-law. Ten years later, she is reunited with Setsuna. Towa wields the sword  and carries the Silver Rainbow Pearl inside her left eye. When her sword is broken, she is capable of unleashing her demonic power to form her demonic energy into the remaining blade. Later she learns to absorb the demonic energy of enemies to empower herself and becomes capable of unleashing her father's  personal attack. Afterwards, it was upgraded into her own variation of her  attack.

Setsuna

 is Towa's younger twin sister and youngest daughter of Sesshōmaru and Rin, the former placing the Gold Rainbow Pearl in her right eye after she was born. She was separated from Towa when they were four-years-old during a forest fire Zero arranged, Jaken erasing her memories with a Dream Butterfly before she is placed in the care of Shiori and later Kaede before being taken under Kohaku's wing as a demon slayer. She is reunited with Towa and gradually regains pieces of her memory before being fully restored once the Dream Butterfly's hold is broken.

While under the Dream Butterfly's influence, Setsuna is unable to sleep while unaffected by the disadvantages of being a half-demon save enter a berserker rage when she lets her demonic blood take hold of her. After Kanemitsu no Tomoe is shattered and later reforged by Totosai into Yukari no Tachikiri with the ability to see and sever the invisible threads of fate along with accessing the most personal memories of those that the threads are connected to. At the base of Mount Musubi, since the barrier is down and as they start heading back to Kaede's village with Rion, the Dream Butterfly have been cut by her father Sesshomaru with the Tenseiga, as she will go to sleep as well, but it is unknown what the sleeping technique will effect on her without the Dream Butterfly. Sestuna later developed a third attack called . It is revealed later on that she has feelings for Hisui.

Moroha

 is fourteen-years-old and the only daughter of Inuyasha and Kagome Higurashi, making her three-quarters human and quarter-demon. Sent away by her parents as an infant for her safety, Moroha was raised by Koga's clan before her mentor sold her to Jyūbei. Aside from being capable of using her father's claw attacks and exorcising demons with a bow and arrow like her mother, she wields the yōkai sword . She also carries a shell-shaped makeup compact similar to the one owned by Izayoi, which she stored the Red Rainbow Pearl in while it was in her possession, holding Tōga's rouge that she applies to her lips to become  with full access to her demonic heritage for the duration of one minute. But she later is able to maintain her form for longer durations after her second battle with Kirinmaru. After finding her parents, who she presumed dead, she placed the second Black Pearl in the rouge since the Red Rainbow Pearl and other Rainbow Pearls have been become Zero's tears again, and she was given a special longbow they had made for her. Using it greatly boosts her sacred arrows spiritual power and effectiveness. After retrieving a strong ice sword from an ice demon, with aid from her long-lost father Inuyasha, Moroha's debt is finally paid.

Recurring Inuyasha characters

Inuyasha supporting characters

Kikyo

 was a powerful, high-ranking priestess who lived fifty years prior to the events of the series. Kikyo was given the task by demon slayers to guard and purify the Shikon Jewel. She fell in love with Inuyasha, who considered using the Shikon Jewel to turn him completely human so it would fade and she could live with him as a normal human. Unfortunately, she was used by Naraku to trick both Kikyo and Inuyasha by disguising as them, and kills Kikyo. She later gets resurrected by the ogress, Urasue, whom robs her grave and forced her to return to life.

In the events of the spinoff, set eighteen years after her third and final demise at the hands of Naraku, her appearance and voice is utilized by the Sacred Tree of Ages itself as a means of communication. The adult Kohaku had told Towa how his travels with Kikyo had left him admiring the undead priestess very much as she was unassailable and had never backed down from anyone. It was she who had defeated and sealed away a strong plant-demon called Root Head shortly before meeting Inuyasha.

Sesshomaru

 is a powerful dog demon (daiyōkai), feared throughout the feudal era. Born of a great demon bloodline, he is the older, more powerful half-brother of Inuyasha. He is usually accompanied by his demon minions, Jaken and A-Un. Chronologically, he is over 200 years old, while according to the official Inuyasha Profiles guide by Rumiko Takahashi, his appearance is equivalent to being 19 years old in human years.

Jaken

 is a small green imp-like demon who is extremely loyal to Sesshomaru, often praising his master's greatness, although Sesshomaru usually ignores and sometimes abuses him. The manga explains little about Jaken's past, but the anime shows that Jaken was once a lord among similar demons. After the older Rin gives birth to Sesshomaru's twin half-demon daughters, Jaken is tasked with protecting them after Sesshomaru hides them in the forest of the Sacred Tree of Ages.

Rin

 is a barefoot orphan girl who tended to Sesshomaru's injuries when she found him under a tree, having lost her family to bandits prior. Rin ended up being killed by wolves under Koga's tribe when they raid her village, resurrected by Sesshomaru using Tensaiga on her. She since accompanied Sesshomaru throughout the events of the series, marrying him many years later as an adult and later giving birth to their twin daughters Towa and Setsuna.

A-Un
 is a two-headed dragon demon with some horse-like features and Sesshomaru's beast of burden who is one of the two yōkai in the series explicitly stated to be a herbivore, like Totosai's ox. Despite traveling with Sesshomaru for centuries, he has no name until Rin gives him one, calling the right head "A" and the left head "Un" (the kanji symbols 阿吽 together translate as "Alpha and Omega"). A-Un can fire yōkai energy from both mouths. The right head shoots blue beams of lightning, while the left shoots green lightning that can control clouds and possibly the weather and has the ability to fly like Sesshomaru. A grey cloud-like gas trails from his legs in flight, similar to Kirara's flames.

Kohaku

 is Sango's eleven-year-old brother who, like his family, is also a demon exterminator. He grew into a confident leader of a new generation of demon-slayers, which included his teenage nephew and Sesshomaru's younger twin half-demon daughter Setsuna. He uses the larger chain-sickle he had gotten from Totosai on demons.

Koga

 is a wolf demon who is the young leader of the Eastern Wolf Demon Tribe that was nearly wiped out by Kagura and Naraku. He first meets Inuyasha as an opponent in battle, but becomes a reluctant, occasional ally despite maintaining a strong sense of rivalry about their relative combat strengths and the courtship of Kagome. After initially kidnapping her for her ability to locate Shikon shards, Koga becomes attracted to Kagome's kindness, spirit and beauty. Inuyasha is always foul-tempered and jealous during Koga's visits because he worries that Kagome might have feelings for Koga, though she has only ever seen him as a friend.

Kaede

 is Kikyo's younger sister that assisted her with various tasks, such as gathering herbs or holding her quiver of arrows. After Kikyo's death, Kaede became an unusually strong shrine priestess in her own right and defends the village against demons. Kaede lost her right eye sometime during her life and wears an eyepatch over it. Supplementary information states that she "lost her elder sister and her eye in an incident fifty years ago."

Myoga

 is a flea demon in service to Toga who was assigned to guard Tetsusaiga's resting place before it was acquired by Inuyasha, accompanying him and later Moroha while providing them intel on topics that include current events and foes. He tends to run and hide during fights despite being a loyal retainer, his presence being a tell-sign of no present danger. Myoga enjoys drinking demon blood, and actually saves Inuyasha's life at one point by drinking a spider demon's venom out of his blood.

Totosai

 is an elderly yokai blacksmith with large, bulging eyes and the creator of Tessaiga and Tenseiga, from the fangs of his old friend, the Great Dog General, who entrusted him to help his two sons. As Inuyasha grows stronger and Sesshomaru grows more compassionate, they become more capable of mastering their respective swords, which Totosai strengthens accordingly. He spends most of his time at his forge inside a volcano, but sometimes travels elsewhere on a flying three-eyed ox named .

Inuyasha antagonist characters

Naraku

 is the half-demon responsible for the misery of most of the main cast, serving as the main antagonist. He was born fifty years ago from the desires of a gravely burned bandit named , who was found, sheltered and fed by Kikyo. Paralyzed by his injuries, Onigumo met a Small Spider Demon and forms a pact with the Small Spider Demon's friends. The surrounding demons attracted to his darkness consume him in return for his soul to occupy a new body created from their merged bodies so that he could satisfy his frustrated lust for Kikyo. But Naraku instead orchestrated Kikyo's death and Inuyasha's imprisonment, biding his time until the Shikon Jewel resurfaced in the Feudal Era. Assuming the appearance of a feudal lord, Naraku spends most of the series modifying his body while attempting to remove what little humanity he had left. It was only at the end of his life that Naraku was revealed to be only a pawn of the Demon within the Shikon Jewel. He is destroyed by Inuyasha's Meidō Zangetsuha in the manga, while purified by Kagome's wish in the anime version.

Demon of the Shikon Jewel

 is the true central antagonist of the entire story. He is the incredibly powerful dragon yōkai created from numerous demons from ancient time that battled the priestess Midoriko before forcing the priestess to trap their souls in what became the Shikon Jewel. The demon is eventually revealed as the force behind Naraku's actions while providing him aid in his offshoot Magatsuhi, having intended him and Kagome to continue the Shikon Jewel's existence, so he can revive in the material world. He is destroyed by Inuyasha's Meidō Zangetsuha in the manga, while purified by Kagome's wish in the anime version.

Magatsuhi

 is the evil corrupting presence within the Shikon Jewel, born from the spirit of the dragon demon. His existence is eventually made known to Inuyasha's group when Naraku gave him a temporary human-like body to act through to assist in the restoration of the Shikon Jewel with the personal goal to completely defile it. As it would later be revealed, Magatsuhi is responsible for sealing Kagome's full spiritual power out of fear of the girl being a threat to him. After losing his temporary body due to Bakusaiga, Magatsuhi resorts to bodily possessions before being stopped by Inuyasha with Dragon-Scaled Tetsusaiga with the power of the demon vortex and killed by Sesshomaru with Tenseiga during the final battle against Naraku.

Naraku's incarnations
After acquiring enough Shikon Jewel shards, Naraku gained the ability to create new demons from his being that are technically his "offspring". However, each is treated by Naraku as expendable minions; tools to use as he wishes. He manipulated some of his earliest creations through threatening to destroy their disembodied hearts should they betray him. Eight detachments were directly created by Naraku within the series' storyline.

Kanna

 is Naraku's first detachment, appearing in the form of a ten-year-old girl in white with a mirror. Kanna is the only person that Naraku trusts with important information about his actions, allowing her to dictate in his stead. As a "concealed incarnation" of Naraku, Kanna has no scent or demonic aura, which makes her undetectable to Inuyasha, Miroku and Kagome, and immune to demonic aura-related effects such as the Hakurei barrier. She also is nice to Kagura and informative of Naraku's warnings. She is immune to the Infant's ability to read hearts to know what someone is truly thinking, but possesses thoughts and feelings of her own.

Kagura

 is Naraku's second detachment, although she is introduced before her "elder sister" Kanna. As a wind witch who is always barefoot, Kagura uses a fan to enhance her powers where she can create a blade-like tornado or use wind to animate dead bodies. She can also use her feather hair-ornaments as transportation, enlarging them to ride in the wind. Kagura has a particularly strong feud with Koga as she slaughtered his tribe on Naraku's orders, and she later attempted to kill him and steal his Shikon shards (though for her own gain, not Naraku's). Kagura desires her freedom from Naraku, indirectly supporting Inuyasha's group despite being their enemy and developing feelings for Sesshomaru. Kagura is later fatally wounded by Naraku when he poisoned her while restoring her heart, spending her final moments with Sesshomaru.

Goshinki

 is Naraku's third detachment, a large horned oni with bladed elbows and extremely powerful fangs. He is extremely agile for his size; however, his most dangerous ability is reading minds, which he uses to avoid dangerous situations and exploit his enemies' weaknesses. When Goshinki breaks Tetsusaiga, he provides Inuyasha's demon lineage the opportunity to take over. Goshinki struggles to read the now feral and blood-lustful Inuyasha before he is completely ripped apart with only his head remaining. Goshinki's head is then found by Sesshomaru, who momentary revives the demon so his fangs can be used by Totosai's expelled apprentice, to create the cursed blade Tōkijin.

Juromaru and Kageromaru
  
While the more human-like Juromaru is like a berserker who is normally shackled with a mask covering his mouth, the parasitic Kageromaru uses his sickled arms to kill Naraku before being placed in his brother's stomach. Acting through a puppet, Naraku later removes the restraints on Juromaru so he and Kageromaru can slaughter Inuyasha's group and Koga. But the two fail and are killed by Inuyasha.

Muso/Onigumo

While technically Naraku's sixth incarnation,  is actually Onigumo himself. Originally faceless and without memory of his past, Onigumo took the face and name of a wandering monk. Eventually with Kagura watching on Naraku's order, Muso ventures to Kikyo's former village and regains his memories of Onigumo and desires for Kikyo. He sees Kagome with Inuyasha and, assuming she is Kikyo, fights him in order to possess Kagome. But Naraku absorbs Muso to restabilize his body.

Akago (the Infant) and Moryomaru
  
  
The  is Naraku's heart and seventh detachment, appearing in the form of a human baby yet can speak fluently and control people with the darkness in their own hearts. It is later revealed that the Infant's appearance was intentional by Naraku as he expected the detachment to be as devious as himself. His goal was to use Kagome to find the remaining shards of the Shikon Jewel. He finds her jealousy of Inuyasha's feelings for Kikyo, but Inuyasha saves her before the Infant can control her. Because the Infant possesses his heart, Naraku had the infant placed under much protection by placing him into an artificial body called . But the Infant and Hakudoshi conspired to destroy Naraku while making themselves the dominant aspect of his being, only for the former and a fully aware Moryomaru to be absorbed by Naraku.

Hakudoshi

While indirectly Naraku's eighth detachment referring to himself as the embodiment of his "essence", possessing his sadism and love for chaos,  is actually created from the right half of the Infant when he was severed in half by the power of a dying monk and matured into a barefoot boy who is extremely dexterous and proficient with a halberd and other handheld weapons. As they were originally one, Hakudoshi possesses many of the Infant's abilities while unable to be killed directly as he does not possess Naraku's heart. Hakudoshi also acquired the demon horse Entei before the steed was killed by Inuyasha. Hakudoshi is destroyed when Naraku calls back his wasps so Miroku can use his Wind Tunnel on him.

Byakuya

 also known by his alias  is Naraku's final detachment created for the sole purpose of acting during Naraku's final moments, a moth-Demon who uses illusions and origami magic while able to detach his left eye to serve as recon. As Byakuya was designed to only exist as long as Naraku lives, his body can be severely damaged when Naraku suffers mortal injuries. Originally, his purpose is to observe Inuyasha and Moryomaru's growing powers and report back to Naraku, gradually becoming more active in his creator's plans. During Inuyasha's final battle with Naraku, Byakuya uses his bladeless sword to absorb a stray Meido Zangetsuha, then carry out his final task: slashing Kagome with a time-delayed Meido that would activate upon Naraku's death. Though killed by Inuyasha's Meido seconds later, Byakuya accepts his fate as he achieved his purpose.

The Band of Seven
The  were group of human mercenaries that were killed a long time ago. They are resurrected in an undead state and manipulated by Naraku through Shikon Jewel shards to hold off his enemies during his time at Mount Hakurei.

Kyokotsu

 is a giant who happens to be both the largest of the Band of Seven and the weakest. Though a giant, Kyokotsu has developed a taste for demons. Kyokotsu terrorizes the wolf-demon tribes before being defeated by Koga in battle, who pulls out his Shikon shard and returns him to the dead.

Jakotsu

 is the Band of Seven's third-in-command and Bankotsu's most trusted ally. A homosexual and homicidal woman-hater who wears women's kimono and sadistically kills his male opponents as a sign of affection. Jakotsu is armed with a snake-like sword which has segmented retractable blades that reach a great distance and bend at a moment's notice, making it difficult for an opponent to calculate his next move. When Inuyasha and his group arrive at Mount Hakurei, Jakotsu battles Inuyasha until he is defeated. The fight leaves Jakotsu severely weakened and Renkotsu uses the opportunity to steal his Shikon shard.

Mukotsu

 is a short man who acts as the Band of Seven's poison maker, concealing his face behind a veil. He abducts Kagome out of lust, attempting to rape her (the anime depicts him initiating a wedding ceremony before Miroku and Sango come to their friend's aid). Though he succeeds in poisoning the human heroes, Mukotsu is killed by Sesshomaru.

Renkotsu

 is the second-in-command of the Band of Seven that often uses wires and fire-breathing skills and later a hand cannon. Renkotsu is the band's most intelligent member and secretly acts against Bankotsu by stealing their comrades' Shikon shards for his use. When Bankotsu learns of this, he kills Renkotsu.

Ginkotsu

 is a cyborg-like member of the Band of Seven, with a slew of different weapons, such as saw blades and a firearm on his back. Renkotsu maintains Ginkotsu's mechanical body, before it is destroyed by Inuyasha. Renkotsu then rebuilds Ginkotsu into a tank-like body. Eventually, Koga causes Ginkotsu to self-destruct by clogging his cannon with a piece of Renkotsu's armor. Ginkotsu's jewel shard is subsequently used by Renkotsu to heal his wounds.

Suikotsu

 was originally a physician who developed a bloodthirsty second persona and is armed with artificial iron claws. After being revived, Suikotsu's good side attempts to live a normal life before his alter ego assumes control at the coaxing of his comrades. At one point, Suikotsu returns to the village with his normal "good" appearance, but is still violent and willing to kill. His good persona ultimately asks Kikyo to take his Shikon shard and kill him to prevent further carnage, but he is killed by Jakotsu before she can do so.

Bankotsu

 is the leader of the Band of Seven, and its youngest and strongest member. Though a skilled mercenary who killed many people, Bankotsu retains a sense of honor and compassion where his comrades are concerned. Bankotsu carries the Zanbatō-like halberd , a weapon he reclaims by attacking the daimyō who executed the band. Defeated by Inuyasha by slicing him in half based on the manga series, and when Banryu's power was reflected by Inuyasha's Bakuryūha attack.

Inuyasha guest characters

Feudal Japan characters

Hachiemon (Hachi)

, otherwise known as simply , is a tanuki from Awa who is a retainer to the tanuki of the Mamidaira clan before becoming Miroku's servant. His basic abilities are low and he has no weapons or skills for battle. He is an unremarkable being, but he understands Miroku well. Although Hachi is Miroku's servant, he often does not travel with him. Since he is a tanuki, he has the ability to transform. If he puts a leaf on his head and transforms, he can assume the form of a giant yellow gourd. He can fly in this state. When he runs away, he can lay down a smoke screen to deceive enemies.

Jinenji

 is a half-demon who lives in a hut with his human mother. Together, they grow a variety of medicinal plants, including some known for being powerful against poisons. He is first seen when Kirara is poisoned by Naraku's miasma and Inuyasha and Kagome travel to the village to find a cure. Because of his demon blood, the villagers falsely suspect him of killing people, but Jinenji is a gentle giant who is scared of humans because of the way they treat him.

Shiori

 is a half-demon who was born from a human mother named Shizu and a bat demon father named Tsukuyomaru, who had died when she was an infant; murdered by his own father in cold blood. She helped grant Inuyasha's Tetsusaiga the useful ability to break through demon barriers, and even Naraku's for a time, after he saves her from her grandfather's grip. In the sequel series, after her mother passed away, Shiori established a haven for half-demon children to live in peace with Setsuna one of her students.

Goryomaru

 was a monk who lived in an old temple with a group of orphaned kids. The children, whose parents were killed by demons, were rescued by him and were taken care of. Goryomaru was attacked by a demon which tried to "absorb" him. While trying to overpower the demon, his arm got replaced by the demon's laser-shooting cannon-like arm. The demon attached to his arm is later revealed to be Moryomaru, who is able to consume the rest of Goryomaru's body following his death at the hands of Hakudoshi.

Toga the Great Dog-Demon

He fathered Sesshomaru with a dog demoness before he fell in love with Izayoi during the Kamakura era. Tōga was fatally wounded sealing Ryūkotsusei after being unable to defeat the dragon, meeting his end when he sacrificed himself to cover Izayoi's escape with their newborn son Inuyasha when her estate is burned to the ground.

Lady Izayoi

 was a gentle, beautiful human, who is the daughter of an impoverished noble house during the Kamakura Era. She fell in love with Toga and bore him Inuyasha, forced to leave her ancestral home when her former suitor Takemaru burned it to the ground in an attempt to kill her and Toga. She died sometime during Inuyasha's childhood, leaving her son Toga's Robe of the Fire Rat and a shell containing Izayoi's favorite rouge, which he gave to Kikyo as a gift via flashbacks in the anime before ending up with Kaede and later Moroha.

Hosenki I

 is an oyster-demon who cultivates a variety of magical jewels. He created the black pearl in Inuyasha's right eye that enabled Sesshomaru to travel to his father's grave and try to steal Tetsusaiga, the sword his father willed to Inuyasha. Needing to return to the netherworld later in the series, Inuyasha's group seeks out Hosenki, but learn that he has died and his namesake son cannot make the gems yet. He tells Inuyasha that he must wait a hundred years before he can make the gems. They find another path to the netherworld where they find the departed Hosenki sitting among the bones of the Dog General's body. However, he has been corrupted by a tainted shard of the Shikon Jewel and attacks Inuyasha. After Naraku reclaims his shard, Hosenki returns to normal and gives Inuyasha the use of "Adamant Barrage", an attack gained by Inuyasha's loyalty to his friends and lack of greed.

Hosenki II

 is an oyster demon who took over his father's duty of creating black pearls, as well as his father's name, after the latter's death. Hosenki II visit Riku to gave him the green Rainbow Pearl, later visit Kagome and Inuyasha at their house in Kaede's village as he heard that Inuyasha inherited his father's powers with the Tetsusaiga: the Adamant Barrage.

Midoriko
 was an extremely powerful priestess who lived centuries before the events of the series. She was well known for her vastly strong spiritual abilities, more specifically her ability to purify demon souls and spirits, rendering them completely powerless. It was because of this ability that she was both hated and feared by demons. In her final battle, she was ambushed by many yōkai. Her spirit is dissolved by Naraku's wish in order to prepare the new place for Kagome in the manga, while purified by Kagome's wish in the anime version.

Naohi

Ginta

 is a wolf demon from the Eastern Wolf Demon Tribe that always follows Koga around, alongside Hakkaku. They both deeply worry about Koga and Kagome since she is almost always in trouble with Inuyasha around.

Hakkaku

 is a wolf demon from the Eastern Wolf Demon Tribe that always follows Koga around, alongside Ginta. They both deeply worry about Koga and Kagome since she is almost always in trouble with Inuyasha around.

Ayame

 is a red-haired wolf demon that appears only in the anime. She is the granddaughter of the North Wolf Demon Tribe's leader. Koga once saved her from the Birds of Paradise and promised to marry her when she got older. In the epilogue of the anime, Ayame finally married Koga.

Mushin

 is an elderly Buddhist monk who raised Miroku after his father was consumed by the Wind Tunnel curse. Despite being a lazy drunk who taught Miroku many of his bad lecherous habits, he cares for the young monk and is a father figure to him. In his first appearance, he was possessed by a demon worm charmer hired by Naraku to kill Miroku, but was saved by Inuyasha. Mushin is not seen in the manga again after this, but is given a slightly larger role in the anime.

Modern Japan characters

Kagome's Family

Mrs. Higurashi is the mother of Kagome and Sota. She is never given a name. The novel Shousetsu Inuyasha reveals that her husband, Kagome's father, was killed in a car accident when Kagome was five years old. Since then, she was widowed and left to take care of her two children, with the help of her father-in-law. She is very supportive of Kagome and welcoming to Inuyasha. She helps Kagome by taking care of the lunches and dinners for her to bring to Inuyasha's world for them to share with her friends. She does not appear to mind Kagome spending long periods of time in the feudal era.

 is Kagome's younger brother, with whom she has a typical brother-sister relationship. He sees Inuyasha as an older brother figure. In Yashahime, he adopted Inuyasha and Kagome's niece Towa as his daughter. He has an optimistic wife named Moe and young daughter named Mei.

 is the paternal grandfather of Kagome and Sota, and Kagome's mother's father-in-law. Grandpa often covers for Kagome's prolonged absences at school with interesting, and often absurd, excuses, which only worries Kagome's friends further.

 is the Higurashis' cat, who was the reason Kagome first found the Bone Eater's Well while she was looking for him. Inuyasha often plays with Buyo when he visits Kagome in her time.

Kagome's Middle School

 is a school friend of Kagome's with an unreciprocated crush on her. Kagome's girlfriends think that they should be together, but Kagome never took the dates he asked her on seriously, despite having agreed and every single time would either forget or bail out on the dates so that she could go back to the feudal era to be with Inuyasha. Hojo is always under the pretense that Kagome has a fatal illness, due to the excuses Kagome's grandfather tells in order to keep Kagome out of school for long periods of time. Because of this, Hojo is frequently seen giving Kagome traditional remedies and supplies for her various fictional illnesses. Sometimes, her grandfather uses the gifts from Hojo on himself. In the climax of The Final Act, Hojo is seen dating his college classmate.

 is one of Kagome's friends and classmates. She has wavy shoulder-length black hair. Being the naive, optimistic, gentle one of the trio, she is the only one of the group to support Kagome's relationship with Inuyasha.

 is one of Kagome's friends and classmates. She has straight shoulder-length black hair and is frequently shown wearing a yellow headband. Like Yuka, she is very outspoken and concerned with Kagome's relationship health, and because of this, she never hesitates to give her opinion on Kagome's potential boyfriends (Hojo and Inuyasha).

 is one of Kagome's friends and classmates. Yuka has neck-length brown hair. Being the most outspoken of the trio, as well as being very sharp-witted, she often expresses concern over Kagome's relationship with her "delinquent boyfriend", Inuyasha.

Recurring Yashahime: Princess Half-Demon characters

Yashahime supporting characters

Yashahime Feudal Japan characters

Kin'u and Gyokuto

Their first appearance was at the end of the Inuyasha when they were about two-years-old. Kin'u wears a Green kimono whereas Gyokuto wears a Pink kimono. In Princess Half-Demon, Gyokuto is with her mother in the demon slayer village. Kin'u is a nun who is undergoing upper-level training to further develop and increase her innate Buddhist-spiritual abilities by her monk father.

Hisui

 is Miroku and Sango's youngest child and only son, and younger brother to Kin'u and Gyokuto. His first appearance is at the end of the Inuyasha as a baby. In Yashahime: Princess Half-Demon, he has become a demon slayer having inherited an ordinary Hiraikotsu from his mother. It is revealed in the second-season finale of the spin-off that he is in love with Setsuna.

Lord Takechiyo

 is a young tanuki who serves under Jyūbei, later revealed to young lord of the Mamidaira clan who was placed in Jyūbei's care by Miroku at the behest of Hachimon. He uses his abilities to shape-shift as means for transport others to places sufficient enough for profit, or when bribed with Towa's modern sweets.

Riku

 is Jyūbei and Takechiyo's mysterious employer who intends to obtain all seven of the Rainbow Pearls for himself. He later develops feelings for Towa and tries to protect her and her family from harm. It is later revealed that he is in fact a living doll created from Kirinmaru's severed horn, and is in the service of Zero with the goal of returning her emotions by collecting the seven Rainbow Pearls for their creator who had taken care of him since he was "discarded like a piece of trash." He becomes Towa's love interest.

Jyūbei

 is the owner of the corpse-dealing shop that specializes in bounties placed on demons. Moroha currently lives under Jyūbei's shop in order to pay off a very large debt.

Yashahime Modern Japan characters

Mei Higurashi

 is the six-year-old daughter of Sota and Moe Higurashi, younger adoptive sister and half-cousin-in-law of Towa, and half-cousin-in-law of Setsuna and the niece of Kagome Higurashi, and the first cousin of Moroha.

Moe Higurashi

 is the wife of Sota Higurashi and the mother of Mei Higurashi, adoptive mother and half-aunt-in-law of Towa, half-aunt-in-law of Setsuna, and the maternal aunt of Moroha, and she is sister-in-law to Kagome Higurashi.

Yashahime antagonist characters

Kirinmaru

 is an ancient qilin demon armed with the Bakuseiken katana, having traveled the world to prove himself as the strongest demon in the world before establishing his domain in the eastern area of Japan. In the distant past, Kirinmaru was a rival to western lands' great demon Tōga, losing his right arm and horn to the dog demon during one of their earlier fights before they established a truce to fend off the Grim Comet. Kirinmaru ignored Tōga's advice of not taking his daughter Rion into battle with him, leading to her death by a half-demon loyal to Emperor Daigo named  whose going to avenge his master's death. This led to Kirinmaru binding her soul among the living with the intent of reviving her while disregarding a prophecy foretold by the Shikon Jewel that he would die at the hands of a half-demon, taking it as a challenge despite Zero's assumption that Tōga's half-demon descendants could be what the prophecy foretold.

After entering a ceasefire with Sesshōmaru after he and Inuyasha prevented another fragment of the Grim Comet from descending, Kirinmaru takes advantage of Osamu Kirin's presence in the Reiwa Era to bring the Grim Comet back to their time so he can destroy it and be recognized as the strongest demon. Kirinmaru's plan prompts the Sacred Tree of Ages into enlisting Towa, Setsuna, and Moroha to stop him from causing a calamity to unfold from his attempt to alter time.

Zero

 is Kirinmaru's older sister who had coveted the love of Tōga of the Western Province, the Great Dog-Demon, becoming embittered and heartbroken when she had the chance to prevent Tōga's death when the Shikon Jewel foretold his demise. Her sorrow at losing him is what created the seven Rainbow Pearls containing her demonic powers and emotions. Having grew to hate Tōga's descendants, she acted on her own to prevent Kirinmaru's death by inflicting Rin with the Silver-Scale Curse in an attempt to force Seeshomaru to relinquish his daughters while binding her life to Rin's with a red thread of fate as added incentive. When that failed, Zero recruits a fire demon named Homura to destroy the forest Towa and Setsuna were in before the twins were separated in the chaos. Zero would make attempts on the twins' lives years alter while having Riku acquire her Rainbow Pearls to regain her power, only for Kirinmaru to scatter then after Seeshomaru revived her with Tensaiga.

After regaining her Pearls and sending Riku away, Zero takes advantage of the twins' memories engraved in her Gold and Silver Pearls as he recruits Nanhoshi to consume Towa in enough rage at part of Zero's gambit for Towa to kill her, with Towa force to live with the guilt of murdering her own mother by proxy. But Sestuna intervenes and servers a second red thread that linked Zero's heart to Tōga before Zero resorts to suicide, causing Zero's memories of her regret to resurface. A repentant Zero end her hold over Rin and has Riku kill her, using her final moment to reveal the reasoning behind Kirinmaru's madness to Towa and Setsuna and that they may free him as she fades away to nirvana.

Rion

 is the fourteen-year-old daughter of Kirinmaru, whose spirit has been sealed away by her father on Mount Musubi for 600 years since her murder at the hands of a half-demon by named Sakasa who took her hostage to avenge his master's death. Once rescued by the Half-Demon Princesses, Rion transferred her mind and spirit into a clay doll containing her bones and grave's soil and achieved an artificial human-looking form similar to Kikyo. Becoming a traveling companion of Riku, traveling briefly with Towa while her aunt Zero was threatening the young half-demon girl's life, seeking to stop her father.

Osamu Kirin

 was the English teacher at Saint Gabriel Academy and Towa's homeroom teacher. Osamu is revealed to be created from Kirinmaru's right arm after Riku dumped into the Bone-Eater's Well as part of Kirimaru's plan to monitor the Grim Comet's arrival to Earth so it can be brought back to the past so it can be destroyed for good. Ending up in the Heisei Era, Osamu learned of how much the world changed since demons went extinct. In the Reiwa era, he's been keeping an eye on the Grim Comet that it's coming closer to the Earth for weeks. But upon learning of Rion's death, Kirin brings the Grim Comet to the Feudal Era with the intent of wiping out all the demons while he and Rion remain to rule over humanity for its own good. He is ultimately defeated by the Half-Demon Princesses with Rion dealing the final blow.

Grim Comet
Tōga and Kirinmaru destroyed a demon infested fragment of the Grim Comet that broke off during the Heian period, Inuyasha and Sesshōmaru doing the same 500 years later. Kirinmaru expected the Grim Comet's eventual return in the distant future, arranging Osamu Kirin's arrival to the present so the comet would be brought to the past and be destroyed for good. But Osamu, after learning of Rion's death, betrays Kirinmaru and awakens the Grim Butterfly to use its power to wipe out every demon while placing himself and Rion as humanity's rulers.

The Four Perils
The  are a quartet of demons that serve under Kirinmaru, each entrusted with a Rainbow Pearl with Riku orchestrating their deaths.

Kyūki

 is one of Kirinmaru's Four Perils who possesses the Purple Rainbow Pearl. Her demon form is a winged tiger. She gave the Purple Rainbow Pearl to Yotsume, the four-eyed owl demon to find weaknesses in the minds of the Half-Demon Princesses via the dream-gazing spell. She is defeated by Towa's Azure Dragon Wave attack, and Riku steals the Purple Rainbow Pearl as he kills her by draining her of her bodily fluids via the blue earring.

More about her history with Lord Kirinmaru and Riku is revealed in "Secret of the Rainbow Pearls", and "The Barrier of Mount Musubi" via flashbacks.

Tōkotsu

 was one of Kirinmaru's the Four Perils, who possessed the red Rainbow Pearl Kirinmaru bestowed him before being killed by Moroha prior to her meeting Setsuna. After he was resurrected by his son Jakotsumaru, as a spector, he was defeated by Setsuna by using her Buddhist powers sealed by Miroku, and Towa banished Tōkotsu to the afterlife.

More about his history with Lord Kirinmaru is revealed in "The Barrier of Mount Musubi" via flashbacks.

Konton

 is one of Kirinmaru's Four Perils. After Kyūki is defeated he takes over trying to annihilate the demon princesses. He has the blue Rainbow Pearl in his second armor after Moroha produced the Crimson Backlash Wave from her Crimson Dragon Wave and her mentor the wolf demon Yawaragi: the Scattering Winds.

More about his history with Lord Kirinmaru and Riku is revealed in "Secret of the Rainbow Pearls", and "The Barrier of Mount Musubi" via flashbacks.

Tōtetsu

 is the last of Kirinmaru's Four Perils to appear.

More about his history with Lord Kirinmaru is revealed in "The Barrier of Mount Musubi" via flashbacks.

Jakotsumaru

 was the son of Tōkotsu, whom he wanted to revitalize by giving him enough bones from mortals, demons, and animals, and after that, turn the bones to red to resurrect his father.

See also

References

Inuyasha characters
Inuyasha